Anisley García (born 19 January 2002) is a Cuban diver. She competed in the women's 1 metre springboard event at the 2019 World Aquatics Championships. She finished in 22nd place in the preliminary round.

References

2002 births
Living people
Cuban female divers
Place of birth missing (living people)
Divers at the 2019 Pan American Games
Pan American Games competitors for Cuba
21st-century Cuban women